The 1939 Syracuse Orangemen football team represented Syracuse University in the 1939 college football season. The Orangemen were led by third-year head coach Ossie Solem and played their home games at Archbold Stadium in Syracuse, New York. The team was co-captained by guard Hugh "Duffy" Daugherty, who would later become a Hall-of-Fame-inducted coach at Michigan State. The Daily Orange predicted before the season that Syracuse will beat all the team except Duke.

Schedule

References

Syracuse
Syracuse Orange football seasons
Syracuse Orangemen football